Jaroslav Timko (born 28 September 1965) is a former Slovak football player. He played for ŠK Slovan Bratislava, Petra Drnovice and FC Spartak Trnava. He played 3 matches for Czechoslovakia and 18 matches for Slovakia. He scored 7 goals.

International goals

References

 

1965 births
Czechoslovak footballers
Slovak footballers
Czechoslovakia international footballers
Slovakia international footballers
ŠK Slovan Bratislava players
FC Spartak Trnava players
Slovak Super Liga players
Living people
Dual internationalists (football)
Czech First League players
FK Drnovice players

Association football forwards